Vowchurch railway station was a railway station on the Golden Valley Railway line between Abergavenny and Hay-on-Wye. It served the village of Vowchurch in Herefordshire, England, from 1881.  The station closed and re-opened three times before the line's closure to passenger services in 1941.

The station comprised a single platform adjacent to the road and level crossing. To the west there was a goods yard which was particularly used for shipping timber. Construction materials for RAF Madley were brought through the yard during World War II. Goods services continued on the line until 1949.

References

Further reading

Disused railway stations in Herefordshire
Former Great Western Railway stations
Railway stations in Great Britain opened in 1881
Railway stations in Great Britain closed in 1941
1881 establishments in England